The English Premier Ice Hockey League (EPIHL) was an ice hockey league of 10 teams, all of which were based in England. Headquartered in Blackpool, the EPIHL was one of two professional ice hockey leagues in the United Kingdom (the other being the Elite Ice Hockey League). A total of 27 teams played in the league at one time or another. Swindon Wildcats were the only team to have consistently featured in the EPIHL from its inaugural season in 1997-98. In 2017, the league was disbanded, with its teams either joining the top-tier Elite Ice Hockey League or the second-tier National Ice Hockey League.

History
The league was founded in 1997, under the banner of "national division", as part of the English National Ice Hockey League in order to serve former members of the British National League who couldn't afford to remain in the latter as a result of increased operating costs; but who were capable of a level of play above the import-free English leagues that made up the rest of the ENIHL. During the 1997-98 season the teams that constituted this division played dual schedules; a series of games solely amongst their own division, and another amongst all the teams that were playing under the ENIHL at that time.

Each year, the league crowned a regular season champion, a post-season playoffs champion, and a knockout Cup champion. Solihull Blaze won the league and play-off trophies of both formats during this inaugural season. At the start of the 1998-99 season the divisions, whilst still both under the ENIHL umbrella, performed in their own separate competitions; and the national division adopted the name "premier division", and later on became known as the "premier league". By the end of the season the league had established itself outside of the ENIHL as the "English Premier Ice Hockey League". In 2005 the BNL disbanded; leaving the EPIHL to take its place as the second tier of the national game.

In 2017, the league was dissolved. The Milton Keynes Lightning and Guildford Flames joined the Elite League, Manchester Phoenix folded, and the remaining seven teams became part of the National Ice Hockey League.

Organizational structure
The league was ruled and governed by the English Ice Hockey Association. The last chairman of the EPIHL was Ken Taggart.

Executives
Chairman: Ken Taggart
Chief Referee: Mohammad Ashraff
Administrator: Mary Faunt
Fixtures Secretary: Gary Dent
Teams Owners Rep: Harry Howton
Statistician: Malcolm Preen
Registrations: Liz Moralee

Teams 2016-17 season

 Notes

 Although the Telford Tigers joined the league in 2005. They did not play in the 2009–10 season due to financial issues.

Former teams

Champions

Team total championships

References

External links
 EPIHL Official Website

 
Organisations based in Lancashire
Defunct second tier ice hockey leagues in Europe
Sport in Blackpool
Professional ice hockey leagues in the United Kingdom